Bhandarpuri  is a village in Bargarh district in the Indian state of Odisha.

Geography
It is almost  from its district headquarters, Bargarh.

Bhandarpuri is a grampanchayat of Jharbandh block of Padampur subdivision, distance from Bhandarpuri to Padampur is about 65 km. This area is mostly hilly and the village is surrounded by many small to medium hills. The area around Bhandarpuri is rain-fed and hence is prone to frequent droughts.

Till date the beautiful locale has not been spoiled by industrialisation, but the per capita income is very low. The Nrusinghanath Temple of Gandhamardhan hills is known in Odisha for Lord Nrusingha.

Bhandarpuri gram panchayat
Bhandarpuri gram panchayat is made up of five villages, namely Bhandarpuri, Jampali, Kukripali, Sukmanipur and Keudadar.

Demographics

 India census, Bhandarpuri had a population of 1362, out of which 665 are male and 697 are female.

Education

Bhandarpuri has a high school named Upgraded Government High School Bhandarpuri, which houses from 1 to 10th standard. There are also three Anganwadis for children below the age of 1.

Politics
Current MLA from Padmapur Assembly Constituency is Bijaya Ranjan Singh Bariha of BJD who won the seat in State elections in 2019. 
  He also won this seat earlier for BJD in 2000 and for JD in 1995 and in 1990 . He was succeeded by Pradip Purohit of BJP, who won the seat in state elections in 2014.
. Other previous MLAs from this seat were Satya Narayan Sahu of INC who won this seat in 2004, in 1985 for INC and in 1980 representing INC(I).

References

Villages in Bargarh district